Gardenvale railway station is located on the Sandringham line in Victoria, Australia. It serves the south-eastern Melbourne suburb of Brighton, and it opened on 10 December 1906.

The station has two side platforms, and is located in an unusual elevated position, located between the Nepean Highway and Martin Street, with access to the station from both.

History

Gardenvale station opened on 10 December 1906, with the whole cost of providing the station met by local residents of the district. The origins of the name of the station, and the suburb itself, are uncertain, although it may have been inspired by nearby market gardens throughout the undulating countryside.

In 1928, the rail bridge over Martin Street, which restored a link between both sections of the street, was constructed, with most of the cost being met by the Brighton and Caulfield councils, and local businesses.

In 1972, the current girder bridge over the Nepean Highway was provided. During the widening of the Nepean Highway in the late 1970s and early 1980s, as the previous rail embankment was removed, the former trestle bridge crossing Elster Creek was uncovered.

There is a large weatherboard building on Platform 1, with a smaller weatherboard building on Platform 2. On 7 December 2009, the building on Platform 1 was severely damaged by fire, which investigators described as suspicious. In January 2011, restoration of the building began, with reconstruction work being completed by the middle of that year.

Platforms and services

Gardenvale has two side platforms. It is serviced by Metro Trains' Sandringham line services.

Platform 1:
  all stations services to Flinders Street

Platform 2:
  all stations services to Sandringham

Transport links

CDC Melbourne operates three routes via Gardenvale station, under contract to Public Transport Victoria:
 : Gardenvale – Melbourne CBD (Queen Street)
 : Middle Brighton station – Chadstone Shopping Centre
 : Elwood – Monash University Clayton Campus

Kinetic Melbourne operates one route via Gardenvale station, under contract to Public Transport Victoria:
 : Gardenvale – The Alfred Hospital

Gallery

References

External links
 Melway map at street-directory.com.au

Railway stations in Melbourne
Railway stations in Australia opened in 1906
Railway stations in the City of Bayside